Revell-Reade is a surname. Notable people include:

Jeffrey Revell-Reade (born 1964/65), London-based Australian businessman
Raymond Northland Revell Reade (1861–1943), Commandant of the Royal Military College of Canada

See also
Reade (name), given name and surname

Compound surnames